Abhishek Hegde (born 1 July 1987) is an Indian cricketer who played for Kerala. He played in 23 first-class, 17 List A, and three Twenty20 matches between 2004 and 2015.

References

External links
 

1987 births
Living people
Indian cricketers
Kerala cricketers
Cricketers from Hyderabad, India